Keelakurunaikulam is a village in Virudhunagar district in the Indian state of Tamil Nadu. Keelakurunaikulam is about 11 km from Aruppukottai nearest town and famous for cultivation of jasmines.

Villages in Virudhunagar district